The getAbstract International Book Award is a bilingual award for nonfiction business-focused books.

History 
The getAbstract International Book Award has been presented annually since 2001 and is awarded to four authors (or co-authors) for their work in English or German. The initial focus of the award was on books from the genres economics, politics, and society. Over the years, the focus has narrowed more specifically to business-relevant books. The award intends to raise the visibility of "(...) titles that make a difference to how [people] think, work, and live.”

Until 2020, the award ceremony took place at the Frankfurt Book Fair; since the COVID-19 pandemic, the award has been presented virtually.

In 2021, the getAbstract International Book Award will include a total financial prize of EUR 20,000.

Media partners 
The getAbstract International Book Award has been presented in cooperation with notable business media partners including Financial Times Germany and Capital.

The 2021 media partner is brand eins.

The award is regularly covered by international media including Financial Times Germany, Handelszeitung & The Wall Street Journal, The Boston Globe, Reuters, Handelsblatt, Bloomberg Television, and several other publications and websites.

Jury 
The jury, responsible for selecting the shortlist and winners, consists of getAbstract staff and external partners. All jury members receive an equal vote. The members in 2021 include the Swiss author Niko Stoifberg and German journalist Peter Lau. The jury considers books published in the twelve months preceding the award.

Winners of the getAbstract International Book Award 
The getAbstract International Book Award traditionally recognizes two books per language category. The awards are weighted equally, without rank or preference.

In 2021, the winners will be announced in November. Winners are selected from the longlists, which in 2021 include titles by Nobel Memorial Prize winner Daniel Kahneman et al., psychologist Jacinta M. Jiménez, and 2019 winner Dan Pontefract.

Chronological list of winners 
2020
 Rosabeth Moss Kanter, Think Outside the Building
 Abhijit V. Banerjee, Esther Duflo, Good Economics for Hard Times
 Veronika Hucke, Fair führen
 Clemens Fuest, Wie wir unsere Wirtschaft retten
2019
 Denise Hearn, Jonathan Tepper, The Myth of Capitalism
 Dan Pontefract, Open to Think
 Kai Strittmatter, Die Neuerfindung der Diktatur
 Benedict Herles, Zukunftsblind
2018
 Rick Peterson, Judd Hoekstra, Crunch Time
 Adam Greenfield, Radical Technologies
 Viktor Mayer-Schönberger, Thomas Ramge, Das Digital
 Martin J. Eppler, Sebastian Kernbach, Meet up!
2017
 Joshua Cooper Ramo, The Seventh Sense
 Mark Stevenson, We Do Things Differently
 Yvonne Hofstetter, Das Ende der Demokratie
 Carsten Hentrich, Michael Pachmajer, d.quarks
2016
 Jonah Berger, Invisible Influence
 Robert Tercek, Vaporized
 Catarina Katzer, Cyberpsychologie
 Jamal Qaiser, Der fremde Erfolgsfaktor
2015
Peter H. Diamandis, Steven Kotler, Bold
Yuval Noah Harari, Sapiens: A Brief History of Humankind
Thomas Mayer, Die neue Ordnung des Geldes
Michael Steinbrecher, Rolf Schumann, Update
2014
Christopher Surdak, Data Crush
Gregory Zuckerman, The Frackers
Pero Mićic, Warum wir uns täglich die Zukunft versauen
Christian Felber, Geld
2013
Jared Diamond, The World Until Yesterday
Nate Silver, The Signal and the Noise
Reinhard K. Sprenger, Radikal führen
Thomas Fricke, Wie viel Bank braucht der Mensch?
2012
Detlev S. Schlichter, Paper Money Collapse
David Weinberger, Too Big to Know
Josef Braml, Der amerikanische Patient
Uli Burchardt, Ausgegeizt
2011
Tom Devine, Tarek F. Maassarani, The Corporate Whistleblower's Survival Guide
Ian Morris, Why the West Rules—For Now
Manfred Hoefle, Managerismus
Tobias Schrödel, Hacking for Manager
2010
David Rhodes, Daniel Stelter, Accelerating out of the Great Recession
Peter Schiff, Andrew Schiff, How an Economy Grows and Why it Crashes
Susanne Schmidt, Markt ohne Moral
Meinhard Miegel, Exit
2009
George Akerlof, Robert Shiller, Animal Spirits: How Human Psychology Drives the Economy, and Why It Matters for Global Capitalism
Niall Ferguson, The Ascent of Money
Miriam Meckel, Christian Fieseler, Christian Hoffmann, Verkauft und nichts verraten
Ludwig Siegele, Joachim Zepelin, Matrix der Welt
2008
Thomas Sowell, Economic Facts and Fallacies
Bill Bonner, Lila Rajiva, Mobs, Messiahs, and Markets
Wolfgang Münchau, Vorbeben
Uwe Jean Heuser, Humanomics
2007
Nassim Nicholas Taleb, The Black Swan
Phil Rosenzweig, The Halo Effect
Norbert Häring, Olaf Storbeck, Ökonomie 2.0
Anja Förster, Peter Kreuz, Alles, außer gewöhnlich
2006
Chris Anderson, The Long Tail
Eugene O'Kelly, Chasing Daylight
Gunter Dueck, Lean Brain Management
Niels Pfläging, Führen mit flexiblen Zielen
2005
W. Chan Kim, Renée Mauborgne, Blue Ocean Strategy
Malcolm Gladwell, Blink!
Ulrich Hemel, Wert und Werte
Peter Sloterdijk, Im Weltinnenraum des Kapitals
2004
Benoît Mandelbrot, The (Mis)behavior of Markets
Oskar Negt, Wozu noch Gewerkschaften?
Alain de Botton, Status Anxiety
Thomas Ramge, Die Flicks
2003
Robert Shiller, The New Financial Order
Paul Glen, Leading Geeks
Burkhard Spinnen, Der schwarze Grat
Hans-Werner Sinn, Ist Deutschland noch zu retten?
2002
Kenneth Cloke, Joan Goldsmith, The End of Management
Joseph Stiglitz, Globalization and Its Discontents
Werner G. Seifert, Markus Habbel, Frank Mattern, Clara C. Streit, Hans-Joachim Voth: Performance ist kein Schicksal
Bjørn Lomborg, Apocalypse No!
2001
Howard Means, Money and Power
Benjamin Mark Cole,The Pied Pipers of Wall Street
Rolf W. Habbel, Faktor Menschlichkeit
Hartmut Knüppel, Christian Lindner, Die Aktie als Marke

References

External links 
 brand eins
getAbstract International Book Award home page
boersenblatt.net - Webzine for the German Book Trade
Wirtschaftsblatt
getAbstract International Book Award 2021 overview

Awards established in 2001
American non-fiction literary awards
Business and economics book awards
Non-fiction literary awards